Tariyani is an Indian village near Kamtaul (35 km north of Darbhanga on SH-75) in Darbhanga district of Bihar state. Other major villages nearby are Massa, Muraitha, Basaith, and Rajaun.

It is under Karwa-Tariyani Panchayat of Jale Block under Darbhanga District. It has a middle school, Panchayat Bhavan, Barka Pokhar and Barely Bazar (bi-weekly Haat on Sunday and Thursday). Jale  being the bordering block of Sitamarhi, Madhubani and Muzaffarpur, Tariyani is easily accessible from these towns as well.

Though the literacy rate is high, however, till recently, the prime source of living were farming, mangoes orchard are also commonly seen there.

A new Panchayat Sarkar Bhavan has been constructed and expected to start functioning by mid of 2020.

A new Hospital (Prathmik Upchar Kendra)is under construction at East-North corner of Barka Pokhar and expected to complete by end of 2020.

Tariyani, the village of Landlords, having considerable Socio-Political influence in the region.

Transport
Connectivity to these areas in general and of Tariyani in particular has had improvement in recent years after construction of roads SH-75 and SH-52.

Tariyani is well connected by road through SH-75 (DKBM Road) and SH-52 (Pupri-Benipatti). The nearest railway station is Muraitha and Kamtaul. 

Darbhanga Airport is within an hour drive from here.

References

External links
 Tariyani at Google Map

Villages in Darbhanga district